Joshua Tree (Foaled March 8, 2007) is an Irish thoroughbred stallion, bred by Castlemartin Stud And Skymarc Farm. He is sired by Montjeu.
He is a four time Group 1 winner, having earned £2.4m ($3.8m) in his racing career. Joshua Tree is the only horse to have ever won the Gr.1 Pattison Canadian International Stakes three times: in 2010, 2012 and 2013. Joshua also won the Gr. 2 Royal Lodge in Ascot at the age of two, the Gr. 2 Prix Kergorlay in Deauville, the Gr. 1 International Invitational cup in Qatar, and the Irish Stallion Farms maiden stakes in Ireland.
He came second in the Gr. 1 Canadian International in 2011, Second in the Gr. 2 Princess of Wales's stakes in Newmarket, second in the Gr. 2 Prix Kergorlay in Deauville and second in the gr. 3  Dubai Gold Cup. Joshua Tree is owned by K Nabooda and K Albahou. He stands at Stud in France.

Racing career
Joshua Tree ranks fourth on the list of earners sired by Montjeu, behind St Nicholas Abbey, Green Moon and Hurricane Run.

Gr.1 Canadian International

First Win
Jockey: Colm O'Donoghue
Trainer: Aidan O'Brien.

Second Win
Jockey: Frankie Dettori
Trainer: Marco Botti.
Grade I

Third Win
Jockey: Ryan Moore
Trainer Ed Dunlop.
The winning time was 2m35.45s.

Pedigree

References 

2007 racehorse births
Racehorses bred in Ireland
Racehorses trained in Ireland
Racehorses trained in the United Kingdom
Thoroughbred family 4-m